Annelie Pompe (born 1981) is an adventurer and athlete from Gothenburg, Sweden. She grew up close to the sea and has always felt at home in the ocean and attributes this as being important to her interest in free diving. She is a professional adventurer, motivational speaker, photographer (mainly underwater), freediving instructor, yoga instructor, writer, personal trainer, helicopter pilot and coach. She has also written a book about her adventures.

Freediving
Despite considering herself a poor swimmer, Annelie Pompe is known for her achievements in competitive freediving. Pompe began her journey into freediving after she received her scuba certification. Within a few years, she realized that she liked diving into the water without equipment. On 5 October 2010 she broke the world record in variable weight freediving, with a dive down to 126 meters. She also claimed one individual silver medal and one team silver medal in the AIDA world championships. She also holds the Swedish record for the deepest freedive without using flippers, 72 meters below the surface.

Mountaineering
Pompe has been sport climbing since she was 13 years old. In May 2011, she climbed Mount Everest as the first Swedish woman to summit from the north side. Despite marketing her attempt as a climb without oxygen, she did end up using bottled oxygen in order to make the summit.
She has also climbed all seven Seven Summits (including Puncak Jaya, and the last one Mount Vinson in January 2016). 

She has been active in other sports, winning a Swedish gold medal in fitness as well as competing in adventure racing, cross country mountain biking, and running.

References

External links
 Annelie Pompe’s personal website
 National Geographic interview with Annelie Pompe on freediving, by Mary Anne Potts, posted 11 November 2010

1981 births
Swedish freedivers
Living people
People from Gothenburg
Swedish summiters of Mount Everest
Swedish sportswomen
Swedish athletes
Swedish-speaking people
Swedish photographers